Dilltown is an unincorporated community in Indiana County, Pennsylvania, United States. Dilltown has a post office, with ZIP code 15929.

References

Unincorporated communities in Indiana County, Pennsylvania
Unincorporated communities in Pennsylvania